Clarendon Parish may refer to:

 Clarendon Parish, Jamaica
 Clarendon Parish, New Brunswick, Canada

See also
 Clarendon (disambiguation)